Now Deh-e Pashtak (also known as Now Deh-e Pashang, Naudeh Pasang, Now Deh Pashang, Now Deh-Ye-Pashang, and Pashang) is a village in Pas Kalut Rural District, in the Central District of Gonabad County, Razavi Khorasan Province, Iran. At the 2006 census, its population was 1,688, in 415 families.

References 

Populated places in Gonabad County